This is a list of published standards and other deliverables of the International Organization for Standardization (ISO). For a complete and up-to-date list of all the ISO standards, see the ISO catalogue.

The standards are protected by copyright and most of them must be purchased. However, about 300 of the standards produced by ISO and IEC's Joint Technical Committee 1 (JTC 1) have been made freely and publicly available.

ISO 1 – ISO 19999

  ISO 1 – ISO 1999
  ISO 2000 – ISO 2999
  ISO 3000 – ISO 4999
  ISO 5000 – ISO 7999
  ISO 8000 – ISO 9999
  ISO 10000 – ISO 11999
  ISO 12000 – ISO 13999
  ISO 14000 – ISO 15999
  ISO 16000 – ISO 17999
  ISO 18000 – ISO 19999

ISO 20000 – ISO 99999
  ISO 20000 – ISO 21999
  ISO 22000 – ISO 23999
  ISO 24000 – ISO 25999
  ISO 26000 – ISO 27999
  ISO 28000 – ISO 29999
  ISO 30000 – ISO 99999

See also
 International Classification for Standards
 List of DIN standards
 List of EN standards
 List of IEC standards
 List of ISO Technical Committees

Notes

References

External links 
 International Organization for Standardization

International Organization for Standardization